Víctor Torres may refer to:

 Víctor Torres (rugby union) (born 1967), Spanish rugby union player
 Víctor Guadalupe Torres (born 1995), Mexican footballer
 Víctor Manuel Torres (born 1958), Mexican politician
 Víctor M. Torres (born 1969), Puerto Rican politician
 Víctor Torres Mestre (born 1970), Spanish footballer
 Victor M. Torres Jr. (born 1947), American politician